"Pony" is a song by American singer Ginuwine, released as the debut single from his first album, Ginuwine...The Bachelor (1996). Ginuwine co-wrote the song with Swing Mob associates Static Major and Timbaland; the latter made his breakthrough as a producer with the song. It peaked at number six on the US Billboard Hot 100 and number two on the Billboard Hot R&B Singles chart.

Critical reception
Larry Flick from Billboard wrote, "This sex jam, played out through horse-riding metaphors, is an even-metered gallop through lovely backing vocals and machine-generated music." He added, "While lead vocal elements are indistinguishable from several similar jams receiving heavy play, "Ginuwine" makes up for it with endearing style and funk. Added vocals run though a synthesizer provide a unique supplemental element to the baseline and act as an interesting refrain." The song received an A− from Matt Diehl for Entertainment Weekly, who said that its "irresistible funk grooves lope at an easy gait, seducing the listener with a velvety tenor and belching synthesizer hook". Tony Farsides from Music Weeks RM Dance Update rated it five out of five, picking it as Tune of the Week. He noted that "given the downtempo mania that's dominated R&B in recent years, it's refreshing to hear a solid uptempo track instead. [...] All in all, a great track and hopefully a deserving hit as well."

Commercial performance
The song peaked at number one on the Billboard Hot R&B/Hip-Hop Songs chart for two weeks from November 16, 1996, to November 30, 1996, and reached number six on Billboard's Hot 100 on November 23, 1996. Internationally, the song reached number three in Australia, peaked at number five in New Zealand, and charted within the top 40 in several European countries.

Music video
The official music video for the album version of the song, directed by Michael Lucero and filmed at the Cowboy Palace saloon in Chatsworth, California, depicts Ginuwine and his crew entering a Western bar as strangers and gradually gaining the favor of the cowboy-patrons. The music video for the remix version of the song (the "Ride It" mix) was directed by Christopher Erskin and shot in a factory. 

Legacy
Along with his concurrent work for Aaliyah's One in a Million album, "Pony" and Ginuwine...the Bachelor marked the emergence of Timbaland as a successful R&B producer. The song experienced a resurgence in popularity after being featured in the 2012 film Magic Mike, its 2015 sequel Magic Mike XXL, and its 2023 sequel Magic Mike's Last Dance. On November 2, 2019, the song was featured in the sketch "Hungry Jury" on Saturday Night Live. In 2021, the duo Altégo posted a snippet of a mashup of "Pony" and Britney Spears's "Toxic" on TikTok, that quickly went viral. In January 2022, the mashup was completed and officially released through Sony Music Entertainment under the title "Toxic Pony", being credited to Altégo, Spears and Ginuwine. The mashup reached number 40 on the Billboard Pop Airplay chart.

Track listings

 US and Australian single "Pony" (album version) – 4:13
 "Pony" (extended mix) – 5:20
 "Pony" (instrumental) – 5:18
 "Pony" (a cappella) – 3:48

 European CD single "Pony" (album version) – 5:25
 "Hello" – 4:06

 UK CD single "Pony" (album version) – 4:13
 "Pony" (extended mix) – 5:20
 "Pony" (Ride It mix) – 5:05
 "Pony" (Mad Love club mix) – 4:32
 "Pony" (Mad Love beat mix) – 4:29
 "Pony" (Black Market Slowride mix) – 4:31

 UK cassette single "Pony" (album version edit) – 4:13
 "Pony" (extended mix) – 5:20
 "Pony" (Mad Love mix) – 4:32

 UK 12-inch single'
A1. "Pony" (extended mix) – 5:20
A2. "Pony" (Ride It mix) – 5:05
A3. "Pony" (Mad Love club mix) – 4:32
B1. "Pony" (Ronin mix) – 4:14
B2. "Pony" (Mad Love beat mix) – 4:29
B3. "Pony" (Black Market Slowride mix) – 4:31

Charts

Weekly charts

Year-end charts

Certifications

Release history

"Pony (Jump on It)"

British house music duo Tough Love collaborated with Ginuwine and revamped the song, which was released on August 7, 2015, as their second single.

Track listings

Charts

Certifications

Release history

See also
 R&B number-one hits of 1996 (USA)

References

External links
 

1996 songs
1996 debut singles
550 Music singles
Epic Records singles
Ginuwine songs
Hip hop soul songs
Music videos directed by Christopher Erskin
Music videos directed by Michael Lucero
Song recordings produced by Timbaland
Songs written by Ginuwine
Songs written by Static Major
Songs written by Timbaland